Limnaecia melliplanta is a moth in the family Cosmopterigidae. It is found on Rennell Island.

References

Natural History Museum Lepidoptera generic names catalog

Limnaecia
Moths described in 1957
Moths of the Solomon islands